Mong Pawk (Wa: mōung bōg) is a city in the de facto independent Wa State of far eastern Myanmar only 10 kilometres from the border with China.  It is just south of Pangkham. It is now the largest city of Wa State.

Geography
Mong Yang is part of Mong Yang Township and is under Myanmar Government control, but Mong Pawk is under the control of UWSA. The 23rd anniversary of a mutiny was held in Mong Pawk on 17 April 2012.

In 2008 the United Wa State Army (UWSA) was strongly against giving away the area of Mong Pawk from its control because it serves as a link with its ally, the National Democratic Alliance Army in Mongla.

References

External links
Satellite map GeoNames

Populated places in Shan State
Wa people